Chumikan is a rural locality (a selo) and the administrative center of Tuguro-Chumikansky District of Khabarovsk Krai, Russia, located at the mouth of the Uda River. Population:

Geography and climate
Chumikan lies on the southern side of the Uda River delta, at the westernmost extremity of Uda Gulf in the Sea of Okhotsk, which contains a number of small islands. The terrain surrounding the town is almost entirely mountainous except for the narrow river valley extending to the west. On the southern side rise the northern spurs of the Taikan Range, highest point .

The climate of Chumikan is subarctic (Köppen Dfc), with mild, wet summers and very cold dry winters which are only marginally moderated by the sea due to prevailing offshore flow from Siberia, although there is sufficient moderation that permafrost is discontinuous rather than continuous as in most of Siberia. Owing to the village’s location near the sea, summers are markedly cooler and wetter than those of the inland territories, with the result that a different type of forest from the inland larch forest, dominated by Picea obovata, occurs. Chumikan is located at a similar latitude as Kaliningrad Oblast on the other side of the country, although being  colder over the year as a whole due to the combined influence of the Siberian High in winter and of the cold Sea of Okhotsk in summer.

History
It was founded in 1885 as a fishing port on the Sea of Okhotsk, and up to these days has never been made accessible by road, even though the area had been a winter port for the Yakut and Evenki people for many years before Russians discovered it. Chumikan soon became a trading center for gold, which was discovered inland within a decade after founding. In the 1920s, after the gold was depleted, Chumikan became, along with other localities along the coast, a center of resistance to the October Revolution.

In the decades that followed, Chumikan's chief role was as a center for the extremely rich fisheries of the Sea of Okhotsk, but during the latter part of the Soviet era, there were efforts to develop major phosphorite reserves known to occur inland. The dissolution of the Soviet Union meant that these efforts have largely disintegrated.

References

Rural localities in Khabarovsk Krai
Ports and harbours of the Russian Pacific Coast
Populated places established in 1885
1885 establishments in the Russian Empire
Road-inaccessible communities of Russia